The Dr Harty Cup, officially known as the Munster Colleges Senior A Hurling Championship, is an annual inter-schools hurling competition organised by the Munster Council of the Gaelic Athletic Association (GAA). It is the highest inter-schools hurling competition in the province of Munster, and has been contested every year, except on two occasions, since 1918. Ardscoil Ris are the centenary Champions winning the title in 2018.

The final, usually held in February, serves as the culmination of a series of games played between October and January. Eligible players must be under the age of 19.

The Dr Harty Cup is an integral part of the wider All-Ireland Colleges Championship. The winners and runners-up of the Dr Harty Cup final, like their counterparts in the Connacht and Leinster Championships, advance to the All-Ireland quarter-finals or semi-finals.

Sixteen teams currently participate in the Dr Harty Cup. The championship begins with a round-robin group stage, followed by a knock-out stage for the top eight teams.

The title has been won at least once by 18 different schools, 12 of which have won the title more than once. The all-time record-holders are St Flannan's College, who have won the competition 21 times.

Cashel CS are the current (2023) champions.

Current format

Tournament
The tournament begins with a group stage of 16 teams, divided into four groups. Each team meets the others in its group once in a round-robin format. The winning team and the runners-up from each group then progress to the quarter-finals. For this stage, the winning team from one group plays against the runners-up from another group.

Qualification for the All-Ireland Championship
As of 2005, the winners and runners up of the Dr Harty Cup qualify for the All-Ireland Colleges Championship. The runners-up qualify for the quarter-finals, while on some occasions the champions receive a bye to the semi-final stage (however, this is done in rotation with the Connacht and Leinster champions).

Trophy
The winning team is presented with the Dr Harty Cup, which is shaped like a traditional mether drinking vessel, similar in design to the Liam MacCarthy Cup. It is held by the winning team until the following year's final. Traditionally, the presentation is made at a special rostrum in the stand where GAA dignitaries and special guests view the match.

The cup is decorated with ribbons in the colours of the winning team. During the game the cup actually has both teams' sets of ribbons attached and the runners-up ribbons are removed before the presentation. The winning captain accepts the cup on behalf of his team before giving a short speech. Individual members of the winning team then have an opportunity to come to the rostrum to lift the cup.

The Dr Harty Cup is named after the former GAA patron, archbishop John Harty who served as Catholic Archbishop of Cashel and Emly from 1913 until his death in 1946.

Roll of honours

Performance by college

Performance by county

Finals listed by Year

Records and statistics

By decade
The most successful college of each decade, judged by number of Dr Harty Cup titles, is as follows:
 1910s: 1 each for Rockwell College (1918) and North Monastery (1919)
 1920s: 4 for Limerick CBS (1920-25-26-27)
 1930s: 4 for North Monastery (1934-35-36-37)
 1940s: 4 each for North Monastery (1940-41-42-43) and St Flannan's College (1944-45-46-47)
 1950s: 4 for St Flannan's College (1952-54-57-58)
 1960s: 4 for Limerick CBS (1964-65-66-67)
 1970s: 4 for St Finbarr's College (1971-72-73-74)
 1980s: 4 each for North Monastery (1980-81-85-86) and St Flannan's College (1982-83-87-89)
 1990s: 4 for St Flannan's College (1990-91-98-99)
 2000s: 3 each for St Flannan's College (2000-04-05) and St Colman's College (2001-02-03)
 2010s: 5 for Ardscoil Rís (2010-11-14-16-18)

See also

 List of Dr Harty Cup winning teams
 Dr Croke Cup
 Leinster Championship
 Corn Uí Mhuirí (Football Championship)

References

External links
 Complete Roll of Honour on Kilkenny GAA bible 

Hurling cup competitions in Munster